Anatoly Nikolayevich Berezovoy (11 April 1942 – 20 September 2014) was a Soviet cosmonaut.

Biography
Berezovoy was born in Enem, Adyghe Autonomous Oblast, Russian SFSR in a Ukrainian family. He was married with two children and graduated from the Air Force Academy.

On 27 April 1970 he was selected as a cosmonaut. In 1982 he flew as Commander on Soyuz T-5 on the first mission to the Salyut 7 space station, returning to Earth on the Soyuz T-7 after 211 days 9 hours. He retired on 31 October 1992 due to age. From 1992 to 1999, he was a Deputy President of Russian Space Federation.

Honours and awards

 Hero of the Soviet Union
 Pilot-Cosmonaut of the USSR
 Order of Lenin
 Order for Service to the Homeland in the Armed Forces of the USSR 3rd class
 Medal "For Merit in Space Exploration" (Russian Federation)
 Officer of the Legion of Honour (France)
 Order "The Sun of Freedom" (Afghanistan)
 Kirti Chakra (India)

External links
 
 Windows.ucar.edu
 the official website of the city administration Baikonur – Honorary citizens of Baikonur

1942 births
2014 deaths
People from Takhtamukaysky District
Soviet cosmonauts
Heroes of the Soviet Union
Soviet Air Force officers
Recipients of the Medal of Zhukov
Officiers of the Légion d'honneur
Salyut program cosmonauts
Spacewalkers